Nokia Asha 501 is a low-end smartphone from the Nokia Asha series, announced by Nokia on 9 May 2013 in India, and released on 24 June 2013. The device is classified by Nokia as a "Full Touch" smartphone. The phone is available in either single- or dual SIM configuration.

The cell phone is built on Nokia Asha software platform 1.0, a new software platform descended from Series 40, with a user interface similar to MeeGo on Nokia N9, and featuring technology from Smarterphone, a software company acquired by Nokia in 2012. The device includes Bluetooth and Wi-Fi, but no 3G connectivity, relying on EDGE and GPRS (2.75G) for mobile-based networking. The phone has been noted for its user-friendliness and a battery with long talk and standby times. It has been called "tiny" by some due to its size, being one of the smallest Nokia ever produced.

The suggested price for the phone is US $99 before taxes and subsidies. Models sold in South Asia support at least eight languages: English, Urdu, Hindi, Kannada, Gujarati, Tamil, Telugu, and Malayalam.

Software

Nokia Asha 501 comes preloaded with the Nokia Xpress browser, which (according to Nokia) compresses data server-side by 90% to facilitate the least amount of transferable data with the phone. Nokia Xpress Now is a new app that offers location-based content.

The device was announced to feature built-in social applications for Facebook, Twitter, and LinkedIn. Other apps announced were Here Maps, Bandai Namco games, EA games, eBuddy, CNN, ESPN, and The Weather Channel.

Here Maps beta for Asha 501 was released on 3 July in select countries. Foursquare was released for the model on 25 July; the app won't require GPS and uses location data from the network connection. A LinkedIn app was released on 6 August for Asha 501 and other Asha full-touch phones. On 7 August 2013 the Line instant messaging app was made available for the device. Other instant messaging apps officially on offer are WeChat and eBuddy Mobile Messenger.

WhatsApp is made available for this phone in November 2013.

Facebook messenger was made available for this device on March 18, 2014.

The phone supports 12 languages native to the Indian subcontinent in the on-screen Swipe keyboard.

The selection of included apps and user interface customisations may vary by availability and geographical region.

Features
Nokia Asha 501 has a Nokia Glance Screen and a Nokia Fastlane plus Screen Double-tap.

A panorama camera and a voice guide on camera for self-portrait were introduced in a new update that rolled out in April 2014. This update also brought a paternal control for the apps installed on the phone.

Reception
Nokia Asha 501 has been noted for its battery, which offers long standby and talk times — 52 days and 17 hours, respectively — that in turn allows the phone to be used in places with inefficient or nonexistent electricity supply.

The Asha 501 was followed by the Nokia Asha 500, 502, 503, and 230, all based on the design of the 501.

Model variants

Gallery

See also
 Nokia Asha 500
 List of Nokia products
 Comparison of smartphones

References

External links
 Nokia Developer device page for Asha 501
 

Nokia smartphones